Arundhati is a 2014 Indian Bengali horror thriller film directed by Sujit Mondal and produced by Shree Venkatesh Films and Surinder Films. The film stars Koel Mallick as a warrior queen. It is the remake of the 2009 Telugu movie of the same name.

Development 

The film is jointly produced by Rajib Tandoon, under the banner of their production houses. It is the remake of the 2009 Telugu film Arundhati, starring actors Anushka Shetty and Sonu Sood. The film is to be made around a budget of 6-7 crores INR.

Cast
 Koel Mallick as Rani Arundhati aka Moni Maa/ Arundhati aka Mishti
 Indraneil Sengupta as Kal Rudra
 Aishi Bhattacharya as young Rani Arundhati
Priyanka Rati Pal as Iraboti
 Debshankar Haldar as Fakir Baba
 Soma Banerjee as Annada ma
 Sujoy as Mishti's would be husband Sid
 Chandicharan as Misti's grand father
 Swarnava Sanyal as Arundhati's son
 Debesh Roy Chowdhury as Aghori Tantrik
 Bharat Kaul as Raja Krishna Kishore Bhatta
 Kaushik Chakraborty as Agnidev Bhatta
 Chandraniv Mukherjee as Shomu
 Mousumi Saha as Mishti's mother
 Dulal Lahiri as priest
Basudeb Mukherjee as Gurudeb
Swagata Mukherjee as Maya (Rudra's mother) 
Moyna Mukherjee

Production

Casting 
Koel Mallick will be seen as a warrior queen for the first time in this film. Regarding her role, she said, "Till the time you don’t experiment or take risks, you don’t know to what level you can go. Playing these larger-than-life characters isn't easy, specially because I have never done it. I needed to first believe in the subject. I believe in reincarnation and life after death. After saying yes, I had to really work very hard on getting Arundhati's body language right."

Filming 
Filming of Arundhati  started on 24 October 2013.  Mallick was reported to have a very busy schedule during the filming of Arundhati. She had to learn horse-riding and sword-fighting for portraying her character in this film. Her horse-riding classes were taken by expert Vikram Rathore, at the Kolkata Maidan during the early hours of the day. Shooting locations include Bolpur and Kolkata. Her sword-fighting sequences are based on the martial art Kalaripayattu.

Soundtrack 

Jeet Gannguli and Koti composed the music for  Arundhati.

References

External links
 

2014 films
Bengali remakes of Telugu films
Bengali-language Indian films
2010s Bengali-language films
Films scored by Jeet Ganguly
Films scored by Koti